Half of Fareham Borough Council in Hampshire, England is elected every two years, while before 2002 the council was elected by thirds. Since the last boundary changes in 2002, 31 councillors have been elected from 15 wards.

Political control
Since the foundation of the council in 1973 political control of the council has been held by the following parties:

Leadership
The leaders of the council since 1995 have been:

Balance of Power
Since the last ward boundary change in 2002, the Conservatives have continually expanded their control of Fareham Council; most recently gaining the 'safe' Liberal Democrat ward of Portchester East ward in a by-election in Autumn 2022.

The current Balance of Power is:

Conservative - 26
Liberal Democrat - 4
Independent - 1

Council elections
1973 Fareham Borough Council election
1976 Fareham Borough Council election (New ward boundaries)
1979 Fareham Borough Council election
1980 Fareham Borough Council election
1982 Fareham Borough Council election
1983 Fareham Borough Council election
1984 Fareham Borough Council election
1986 Fareham Borough Council election
1987 Fareham Borough Council election
1988 Fareham Borough Council election
1990 Fareham Borough Council election
1991 Fareham Borough Council election
1992 Fareham Borough Council election
1994 Fareham Borough Council election
1995 Fareham Borough Council election
1996 Fareham Borough Council election
1998 Fareham Borough Council election
1999 Fareham Borough Council election
2000 Fareham Borough Council election
2002 Fareham Borough Council election (New ward boundaries reduced the number of seats by 11)
2004 Fareham Borough Council election
2006 Fareham Borough Council election
2008 Fareham Borough Council election
2010 Fareham Borough Council election
2012 Fareham Borough Council election
2014 Fareham Borough Council election
2016 Fareham Borough Council election
2018 Fareham Borough Council election 
2021 Fareham Borough Council election
2022 Fareham Borough Council election

Borough result maps

By-election results

References

By-election results

External links
Fareham Borough Council

 
Council elections in Hampshire
Politics of the Borough of Fareham
Fareham